Edward Ludlow Wetmore (March 24, 1841 – January 19, 1922) was a Canadian judge and politician.

Born in Fredericton, New Brunswick, the son of Charles Peters Wetmore and Sarah Burr Ketchum, he received a Bachelor of Arts degree from the University of New Brunswick in 1859. He was called to the New Brunswick bar in 1864. From 1874 to 1876, he was the mayor of Fredericton. He was elected to Legislative Assembly of New Brunswick and was Leader of the Opposition from 1883 to 1886. In 1886, he was appointed to the Supreme Court of New Brunswick.

In 1887, he was appointed puisne judge of the first Supreme Court of the Northwest Territories and in 1907 he was appointed the 
first Chief Justice of Saskatchewan. He served in this position until 1912.

In 1907, he became the first Chancellor of the University of Saskatchewan and served in this position until 1917.

He died in Victoria, British Columbia on January 19, 1922.

References 

 

1841 births
1922 deaths
Canadian university and college chancellors
Mayors of Fredericton
Members of the Legislative Assembly of New Brunswick
Judges in Saskatchewan
University of New Brunswick alumni
Colony of New Brunswick people
Judges in New Brunswick
Judges in the Northwest Territories
Academic staff of the University of Saskatchewan